Jaroslav Slúčik is (born 27 April 1963 in Žilina) a former Czechoslovak-Slovak slalom canoeist and wildwater canoeist who competed in canoe slalom in the 1980s and in wildwater canoeing until 2013. He won a bronze medal in the C1 team event at the 1987 ICF Canoe Slalom World Championships in Bourg St.-Maurice. He is also a multiple world champion in wildwater canoeing in C2 together with his partner Vladimír Vala.

World Cup results
Slúčik won seven editions of the Wildwater Canoeing World Cup in C2 classic.

References

External links
Official website

Czechoslovak male canoeists
Slovak male canoeists
Living people
1963 births
Medalists at the ICF Canoe Slalom World Championships
Sportspeople from Žilina